Walter Burton may refer to:
 Walter Moses Burton, Texas state senator
 Walter John Burton, New Zealand photographer